Disney Junior is a Romanian pay television preschool channel owned by The Walt Disney Company Limited in London. It was launched as a programming block in 1 June 2011, named as Disney Junior Pė Disney Channel and is Currently a channel since 1 March 2012. Playhouse Disney was rebranded as Disney Junior on 1 June 2011. It is the kids aimed 2-7 programming block on Disney Channel. Every show on the channel is dubbed by Ager Film Studio.

See also

 Disney Channel Romania

References

External links
Disney Romania on YouTube

Television stations in Romania
Television channels and stations established in 1999
Romania
1999 establishments in Romania